

The Naval General Service Medal (NGSM) was a campaign medal approved in 1847, and issued to officers and men of the Royal Navy in 1849. The final date for submitting claims was 1 May 1851. Admiral Thomas Bladen Capel was one of the members of the board that authorised the medal.

The NGSM was awarded retrospectively for various naval actions during the period 1793–1840, a period that included the French Revolutionary Wars, the Napoleonic Wars and the Anglo-American War of 1812. Each battle or campaign covered by the medal was represented by a clasp on the ribbon. The medal was never issued without a clasp, 231 of which were sanctioned. The clasps covered a variety of actions, from boat service, ship to ship skirmishes, to major fleet actions such as the Battle of Trafalgar.

This medal and its army counterpart, the Military General Service Medal, were amongst the first real British campaign medals, issued to all ranks for serving in combat actions.

Eligibility
The medal was only awarded to surviving claimants.  A combination of factors, from general illiteracy to limited publicity for the new medal meant that many did not apply for it. While next of kin could not apply on behalf of a deceased relative, they did receive the medal in cases where the claimant had died between their application and actual award. 

The belated nature of the award meant that, for many clasps, substantially fewer medals were issued when compared with the numbers present. Frequently the number of claimants for individual clasps was reckoned in single figures and for ten clasps there were no claimants. 

Sir John Hindmarsh and Admiral of the Fleet Sir James Gordon were awarded medals with seven clasps, the most awarded to any individual. Four men qualified for six clasps and fourteen for five clasps. 

A baby born on board  during the battle of the Glorious First of June, christened Daniel Tremendous McKenzie, applied for and received the medal with the '1 June 1794' clasp. Jane Townshend, a woman aboard  at the Battle of Trafalgar, had her application for the medal initially approved. The medal was not finally awarded however, with the roll of recipients endorsed "upon further consideration this can not be allowed". An award may have set a precedent for claims by other women, mainly wives of sailors present during naval actions.

A total of 126 awards were made to officers and men of the British Army, present on board HM's ships at qualifying actions. This included 26 with the 'Copenhagen 1801' clasp and 50 with the 'Syria' clasp. Of these recipients, 8 officers and 18 men also received the Military General Service Medal.

The Admiralty awarded 20,933 medals in total. Of these, 15,577 went to individuals who received only one clasp.

Appearance
 Obverse: a left facing effigy of Queen Victoria with the inscription "VICTORIA REGINA" and the date “1848”.
 Reverse: The figure of Britannia, holding a trident, seated on a seahorse.
 Naming: The name of the recipient is impressed on the rim in block Roman capitals. Medals to officers and warrant officers also include the recipient's rank.

Clasps

A total of 231 clasps were authorised, including 176 for specific actions and 55 for Boat Service, that is service in ships' boats when boarding enemy ships or as part of a shore raiding party.

French Revolutionary Wars

Napoleonic Wars

War of 1812

Later battles or actions

Citations

References
 
 
 
 Joslin, Litherland, and Simpkin (eds), British Battles and Medals, (1988), Spink

External links
Naval General Service Medal Roll (1793–1840)
Naval General Service Medal: List of clasps. Medals.org.uk

Some muster rolls, for ships involved in fleet actions 1794–1811, held at The National Archives, Kew

British campaign medals
British military medals of the Napoleonic Wars